Allium guanxianense is a plant species endemic to Sichuan in China. It is  found on damp slopes at elevations of 1800–2000 m.

Allium guanxianense has thick fleshy roots but thin bulbs rarely more than 10 mm across. Scapes are up to 60 cm tall, round in cross-section. Leaves are flat, narrowly oblanceolate, shorter than the scape and 2–3 cm wide. Umbel is spherical, with white flowers.

References

guanxianense
Onions
Flora of China
Flora of Sichuan
Plants described in 1993